Erebus Bay is a bay about  wide between Cape Evans and Hut Point Peninsula, on the west side of Ross Island. The bay was explored by the British National Antarctic Expedition, 1901–04, under Robert Falcon Scott. It was named by Scott's second expedition, the British Antarctic Expedition, 1910–13, which built its headquarters on Cape Evans; the feature is surmounted by Mount Erebus.

The small island of Turtle Rock sits within Erebus Bay. It was discovered during Scott's first expedition, and so named because of its low rounded appearance.

References 

Bays of Ross Island